Cookin' the Blues is a live album by saxophonist James Moody recorded in San Francisco in 1961 and released on the Argo label in 1964.

Reception

The Allmusic site awarded the album 4 stars.

Track listing 
All compositions by James Moody, except as indicated
 "The Jazz Twist" - 6:36   
 "One For Nat" (Gene Kee) - 5:52   
 "Bunny Boo" - 5:30   
 "Moody Flooty" - 4:12   
 "It Might as Well Be Spring" (Richard Rodgers, Oscar Hammerstein II) - 5:45   
 "Disappointed" (Eddie Jefferson) - 2:06   
 "Sister Sadie" (Horace Silver) - 2:42   
 "Little Buck" - 3:15   
 "Home Fries" (Kee) - 6:12

Personnel 
James Moody - alto saxophone, tenor saxophone, flute
Howard McGhee - trumpet
Bernard McKinney - trombone
Musa Kaleem - baritone saxophone
Sonny Donaldson - piano
Steve Davis - bass
Arnold Enlow - drums
Eddie Jefferson - vocals - (tracks 6 & 7)

References 

James Moody (saxophonist) live albums
1964 live albums
Argo Records live albums
albums recorded at the Jazz Workshop